Potent  may refer to:
 
Vair#Potent for the heraldic fur
Warren Potent for the Australian Olympic medalist in shooting

See also:
Potency (disambiguation)